The Second Kubilius Cabinet was the 15th cabinet of Lithuania since 1990. It consisted of the Prime Minister and 13 government ministers (14 after the Ministry of Energy was re-established in 2009).

History 
After the parliamentary elections in October, President Valdas Adamkus appointed Andrius Kubilius, the leader of the Homeland Union, as the Prime Minister on 28 November 2008. Kubilius had previously headed the 10th cabinet between 1999 and 2000. The 15th cabinet received its mandate and started its work on 9 December 2008, after the Seimas gave assent to its program.

The coalition, which formed on 17 November 2008, and supported the government named itself as "Coalition of Change".

In first two months of 2010 National Resurrection Party dissenters formed new Christian Party. By this time, the government lost its majority and relied on Lithuanian Peasants Popular Union support, which lasted up until October of the same year. In September, 2011 National Resurrection Party merged with the Liberal and Centre Union, what reduced the number of parties participating in coalition from four to three. By April 2012 the government lost majority in Seimas.

Despite an economic crisis and austerity measures implemented to face it, the cabinet became the first government of Lithuania since the independence to serve the full four-year term of the Tenth Seimas, returning its mandate on 16 November 2012, after the elections to the Seimas in October. The government continued to serve in an acting capacity until the Butkevičius Cabinet started its work on 13 December 2012.

Cabinet
The following ministers served on Kubilius Cabinet.

References 

Kubilius2
2008 establishments in Lithuania
2012 disestablishments in Lithuania
Cabinets established in 2008
Cabinets disestablished in 2012